1986 in the Philippines details events of note that happened in the Philippines in the year 1986.

Incumbents

Fourth Republic (1984–86)
President: Ferdinand Marcos (KBL) (deposed February 25, 1986)
Vice President: Arturo Tolentino (KBL)
Chief Justice: Ramon Aquino
Philippine Congress: Regular Batasang Pambansa
House Speaker: Nicanor Yñiguez (KBL)

Revolutionary Government (March 25 – June 2, 1986) and Fifth Republic (1986 – present)

President: Corazon Aquino (PDP-Laban)
Vice President: Salvador Laurel (UNIDO)
Chief Justice: Claudio Teehankee (1986–88)

Events

February

 February 7 – Presidential snap elections are held. Pres. Marcos leads the tally made by the Commission of Elections (Comelec), but his opponent, Corazon Cojuangco–Aquino, leads another tally by the National Movement for Free Elections (Namfrel).
 February 9 – Thirty Comelec computer technicians walk out of their tabulation center at the PICC to protest attempts to manipulate the election results.
 February 11 – Opposition Antique former Gov. Evelio Javier is assassinated in front of the provincial capitol as the canvassing is being held there.
 February 15 – Pres. Marcos (and Tolentino) are declared by the Batasang Pambansa as winners in the poll canvass.
 February 16 – Cojuangco–Aquino leads Tagumpay ng Bayan (Victory of the People) rally in Luneta Grandstand with over 2 million attendees; proclaims victory in spite of the previous proclamation.
 February 22 – People Power Revolution (Day 1): Deputy Armed Forces of the Philippines (AFP) chief Lt. Gen. Fidel Ramos and Defense Minister Juan Ponce Enrile, backed by members of the armed forces loyal to the former, declares coup at a press conference at Camp Aguinaldo to call upon Pres. Marcos to resign and to announce their withdrawal of support; they seize key military camps; Jaime Cardinal Sin urges the public to support the troops.
 February 23 – People Power Revolution (Day 2): Opposition supporters, gathered around camps Crame and Aguinaldo along Epifanio delos Santos Avenue (EDSA), form human barricades; targeting loyalist marine forces are stopped by them.
 February 24 – People Power Revolution (Day 3): Reformist rebels storm government offices, radio and television stations, Camp Aguinaldo, Villamor Airbase, and Malacañan Palace; 15th Air Force Strike Wing, with Col. Antonio Sotelo, defects to the rebels; Col. Mariano Santiago leads the soldiers who take over government-owned Channel 4.
 February 25 – People Power Revolution (Day 4): 
 Cojuangco–Aquino swears in as the 11th and first female President of the Philippines before Chief Justice Claudio Teehankee at the ceremonies in Club Filipino in San Juan.
 Marcos also swears in as President of the Philippines at Malacañan Palace; his own inauguration ceremonies are interrupted as other television stations are destroyed by rebels.
 Ousted Marcos and his family are transported through airlift by four United States helicopters to Clark Air Base.
 February 26 – From Clark Air Base, Marcoses flee to Guam and to Hawaii.
 February 28:
 Presidential Commission on Good Government is formed by  president Aquino.
 Investigation on Marcos' wealth.

March 
 March 5 – Pres. Aquino frees alleged NPA founder Bernabe Buscayno and the other three, last suspected communist leaders.
 March 17 – Pilipino Star Ngayon is established as a first post-revolution tabloid newspaper.
 March 20 – City 2 Television (formerly BBC 2) is dissolved by Aquino.
 March 25 – Pres. Aquino abolishes the national assembly and the constitution; declares an interim constitution (Freedom Constitution, Proclamation No. 3) effective until a new one would be ratified in a national plebiscite.

April 
  April 3 – More than 15,000 workers at the Subic Bay Naval Base returns to work following a 12-day walkout.
 April 24:
 Eight soldiers, a known Reuters chief photographer and a Manila Bulletin reporter, die in an ambush by the New People's Army members in Cagayan.
 Inter-island ship MV Doña Josefina sinks off the coast of Isabel, Leyte, with 34 passengers died and more than a hundred people reported missing.

May 
 May 23:
 The Supreme Court declares legitimate the provisional Aquino government.
 A bus falls from a cliff in a village in Hamtic, Antique, killing 23 people and injuring 15 others.

June
 June 2 – Freedom Constitution is ended to give way for the adoption of a new constitution.

July
 July 4 – Street clashes in an anti-nuclear rally outside the US Embassy injure 14 policemen and six demonstrators.
 July 6 – Former Vice Pres. Arturo Tolentino, with Marcos loyalists and more than 300 soldiers, takes over the Manila Hotel; proclaims himself as "acting president"; Tolentino leaves the hotel and begins surrender talks on the 7th; they are forced to surrender peacefully after the failure of the coup that lasted until the 8th. Col. Rolando Abadilla would be identified as the mastermind.
 July 9 – Pres. Aquino prohibits rallies by Marcos supporters.
 July 22 – DZMM and DWKO established as the first post-revolution radio stations.
 July 28 – The Philippine Star established as the first post-revolution newspaper. Its first issue is published.

September
 September 1 – Muslim rebel leader Nur Misuari returns from exile in Libya for negotiations aimed at ending Muslim conflicts.
 September 2 – Typhoon Miding hits northern Luzon killing 36 people.
 September 5 – Pres. Aquino and Misuari, in Jolo, agree for negotiations aimed at ending a 14-year conflict.
 September 12 – The Supreme Court orders a retrial for former military chief Gen. Fabian Ver, 24 other military men, and a civilian, all acquitted in 1985 regarding their involvement in the 1983 murder of Benigno Aquino Jr. and Rolando Galman, as recommended on July 31 by a commission appointed by the Supreme Court.
 September 13 – The Mt. Data Peace Accord was signed between the Philippine Government and the separatist Cordillera Bodong Administration-Cordillera People's Liberation Army.
 September 14 – ABS-CBN went back on the air once again as it began rebroadcast to viewers and for station ID, the network carries the first tagline Watch Us Do It Again! followed by the second tagline Sharing A New Life with You. It features the first channel 2 logo is a wing-shaped blue crest with a white curved at the top and a white line as a tail, the Broadway 2 logo was used until 1987.
 September 21 – Thanksgiving Day cease to be celebrated after the EDSA Revolution and the fall of Marcos dictatorship. The tradition is no longer being celebrated.
 September 29 – NPA leader Rodolfo Salas is arrested in Manila. Rebellion charges are filed by the government against him and two others, Oct. 2.

October
 October 15 – Signing of the new constitution by Cecilia Muñoz-Palma and other members of the commission.
 October 20 – Milk Code of 1986 (Executive Order No. 51) is signed by Aquino in order to implement rules and regulations in the manufacture of infant formula products.

November
 November 11 and 22 – A coup plot by ex-government officials loyal to former Pres. Marcos and by a military faction loyal to Defense Minister Enrile, codenamed "God Save the Queen", is foiled by the government. After a failed coup attempt, Enrile is among the cabinet officials replaced by Pres. Aquino, Nov. 23.
 November 12–13 – Kilusang Mayo Uno leader Rolando Olalia and his driver, Leonor Alay-ay, are abducted by armed men in Pasig City, Nov. 12; are found dead in Antipolo, Rizal the following day. In connection with the murder, two soldiers are placed by the police under arrest as suspects, Dec. 1; a former AFP sergeant is arrested, Dec. 18. Of the 13 Reform the Armed Forces Movement members charged with the murders, Eduardo Kapunan, Jr. would be acquitted in 2016; three of them would be convicted in 2021.
 November 27 – Government and rebel negotiators sign a 60-day ceasefire agreement, effective from Dec. 10, 1986 to Feb. 8, 1987.

December
 December 30 – AFP orders to arrest armed guerrillas entering populous areas.

Holidays

As per Act No. 2711 section 29, issued on March 10, 1917, any legal holiday of fixed date falls on Sunday, the next succeeding day shall be observed as legal holiday. Sundays are also considered legal religious holidays. Bonifacio Day was added through Philippine Legislature Act No. 2946. It was signed by then-Governor General Francis Burton Harrison in 1921. On October 28, 1931, the Act No. 3827 was approved declaring the last Sunday of August as National Heroes Day. As per Republic Act No. 3022, April 9th was proclaimed as Bataan Day. Independence Day was changed from July 4 (Philippine Republic Day) to June 12 (Philippine Independence Day) on August 4, 1964.

 January 1 – New Year's Day
 February 22 – Legal Holiday
 March 27 – Maundy Thursday
 March 28 – Good Friday
 April 9 – Araw ng Kagitingan (Day of Valor)
 May 1 – Labor Day
 June 12 – Independence Day
 August 13  – Legal Holiday
 August 31 – National Heroes Day
 November 30 – Bonifacio Day
 December 25 – Christmas Day
 December 30 – Rizal Day

Entertainment and culture

 December 27 – Corazon Aquino is named as Time magazine's woman of the year.

Births
 January 4 – Katrina Halili, model and actress
 January 13 – Jan Manual, comedian
 January 25 – Luane Dy, Filipino showbiz television personality, host and actress
 January 26:
 Sean Anthony, basketball player
 Kian Kazemi, actor and part-time model
 Ervic Vijandre, actor
 February 12 – Georgina Wilson, model, actress, and host
 February 18 – Brenan Espartinez, singer
 March 10: 
 Aaron Atayde, radio DJ, TV host and sports anchor
 J.C. de Vera, actor, host, and endorser
 March 20 – Jam Sebastian, YouTube content creator (d. 2015)
 March 28 – Dion Ignacio, actor
 April 11 – RJ Jazul, Basketball player
 May 16 – Shamcey Supsup, Miss Universe 2011 3rd Runner-up
 May 17 – Ruben Doctora, football player
 May 23 – Karla Henry, Miss Earth 2008
 May 25 – Marcy Arellano, basketball player
 May 26 – Alex Medina, actor
 June 6 – Anton dela Paz, TV Personality
 June 8 – Japoy Lizardo, actor, taekwondo practitioner, and endorser
 June 12 – Carla Abellana, actress and host
 June 15 – Mark Canlas, basketball player
 June 29 – Iya Villania, actress and host
 June 30 – Jayson Castro, basketball player
 August 8 –  Hezy Val B. Acuña II, basketball player
 August 16 – Reil Cervantes, basketball player
 August 21 – Stephan Schröck, football player
 August 25 – Gilbert Bulawan, basketball player (d. 2016)
 August 29 – Joem Bascon, actor
 August 31 – Rachelle Ann Go, singer
 September 1 – JVee Casio, basketball player
 September 4 – James Younghusband, football player
 September 9 – Jervy Cruz, basketball player
 September 13 – Sugar Mercado, dancer and actress
 September 27 – Chai Fonacier, actress and singer
 October 2 – Pancho Magno, actor
 October 5 – Shiima Xion, wrestler
 October 22 – Matt Evans, actor
 November 3 – Jasmine Trias, singer, songwriter
 November 4 – Angelica Panganiban, actress
 November 7 – Boobay comedian and TV host
 November 22 – Erika Padilla, actress, model, and courtside reporter
 November 23 – Maxene Magalona, actress
 November 30 – Beau Belga, basketball player
 November 5 – Dianne Medina, actress, model, dancer, television host, news anchor
 November 24 – Val Acuña, basketball player
 December 14 – Mark Herras, actor
 December 21 – Karel Marquez, actress, singer, and TV host
 December 22 – Arianne Caoili, chess player (d. 2020)
 December 23 – James Walsh, swimmer
 December 31 – Mike Tan, actor

Deaths
 February 11 – Evelio Javier, politician and Governor of Antique (b. 1942)
 February 25 – Nemesio Yabut, politician and Mayor of Makati (b. 1925)
 April 15 – Col. Emma Henry, first female American in the Philippine Constabulary.
 May 7 – Juan Nakpil, Architect (b. 1899)
 July 21 – José Avelino, Senate President of the Philippines (b. 1890)
 August 23 – Eduardo Quisumbing, National Scientist and Plant botanist (b. 1895)
 November 8 – Eddie del Mar, actor (b. 1919)
 November 10 – Rogelio de la Rosa, actor and Senator (b. 1914)
 November 13 – Rolando Olalia, labor leader; chair of Kilusang Mayo Uno
 November 22 – Ulbert Ulama Tugung, known Muslim leader and former parliamentarian.

See also
 1986-1987 Philippine coup attempts
 Philippines

References